Nang talung is a traditional style of shadow puppetry from southern Thailand. Similar arts are found in Cambodia, Malaysia, and Indonesia. Nang means "leather" ("leather puppet" in this case), and talung is an abbreviation of Pattalung, a southern city where the shadow play tradition has long been popular. Nang yai features life-size puppets, while nang talung puppets are much smaller.

Southern Thailand's puppets are made of leather and are typically between 15 and 50 centimeters in size. The performance consists of the puppets, the narrator, the actor, and the musician. The actor and the audience are separated by a white screen during the show.

Nang talung has been extremely popular for a long time. On the other hand, the art form is slowly disappearing because it is complicated. There is a campaign to preserve the traditions of nang talung for future generations.

The Malaysian wayang kulit gedek has its origin from Nang Talung.

See also
Hun krabok
Nang yai
Wayang

References 

Malaysian culture
Thai culture
Shadow play
Cultural history of Thailand